Van Gogh is a crater on Mercury.  Its name was adopted by the International Astronomical Union (IAU) in 1976. Van Gogh is named for the Dutch painter Vincent van Gogh.

To the south of Van Gogh is Bernini crater, and to the east is Cervantes.

References

Impact craters on Mercury